Mirza Muhammed Ibrahim or Mirza Mohammad Ibrahim  (1800 – July, 1857) was an educator who traveled from his native Persia (now Iran) to Britain in 1826. There, he took up a permanent appointment to teach oriental languages at the prestigious East India Company College, where he remained until 1844. While there, he also worked as an official translator, becoming friendly with Lord Palmerston. He was the author of an English and Persian grammar textbook.

There were rumours that he had left Persia because of religious differences with the establishment. However, while abroad, he remained a faithful Muslim, despite the prevailing British social climate in favour of Christianity.

After returning to Persia in 1844, he became tutor to the future Shah.

References

External links
 

Iranian educators
Iranian expatriates in the United Kingdom
British East India Company people
1857 deaths
1800 births
Year of birth uncertain